Moishe Lewis (born Losz, sometimes known as Morris Lewis, 1888–1950) was a Jewish labour activist in eastern Europe and Canada.

Life
A tanner by trade, he was born and raised in the Svisloch shtetl in the Russian Empire (later part of Poland and now Belarus). Moishe Losz was the chairman of the Jewish Labour Bund in Svisloch. The Bund was both an active political party and a Jewish, Socialist labour movement.  It was preoccupied in changing the system that was at the roots of low pay and dangerous, harsh working conditions.

When the Russian Civil War and the Polish-Soviet War were at their fiercest, in the summer of 1920, Poland invaded, and  the Bolshevik Red Army counter-attacked. Svisloch was on the Polish-Russian border and was occupied by the Soviets in July 1920. Moishe Losz openly opposed the Bolsheviks and would later be jailed by them for his opposition. He barely escaped with his life. When the Polish army recaptured Svisloch on August 25, 1920, they executed five Jewish citizens as "spies." This was a false charge and was more of a tactic to keep the locals scared and discourage them from participating in counter insurgency. Realising that he was not safe under either regime, and the prospects for the future of his family were bleak, he left for Canada in May 1921, to work in his brother-in law's clothing factory in Montreal, Quebec.

Losz anglicized the family name to "Lewis" and saved up enough money to send for his family within a few months.

Lewis resumed his labour activism in Canada becoming involved with the Arbeiter Ring (Workmen's Circle). He was Secretary of the Canadian Jewish Labour Committee, a labour and civil rights organization, for several decades.

In 1947, Lewis and Kalmen Kaplansky spearheaded "The Tailors Project" by the Workmen's Circle and Jewish Labour Committee to bring European Jewish refugees to Montreal to work in the needle trades. They were able to do this through the federal government's "bulk-labour" program that allowed labour-intensive industries to bring European displaced persons to Canada, in order to fill those jobs. For Lewis' work on this and other projects during this period, the Montreal branch was renamed the Moishe Lewis Branch, after he died in 1950. The Jewish Labour Committee also honored him when they established the Moishe Lewis Foundation in 1975.

Descendants
His son David Lewis would become a labour lawyer and leading figure in the Co-operative Commonwealth Federation and then leader of the federal New Democratic Party. His grandson Stephen Lewis was leader of the Ontario New Democratic Party in the 1970s and later Canada's ambassador to the United Nations. His great-grandson is Avi Lewis, the political journalist, who has made documentaries with his wife Naomi Klein.

References

1888 births
1950 deaths
Activists from Montreal
Bundists
Canadian civil rights activists
Canadian socialists
Canadian trade unionists
Jewish Canadian activists
Jews from the Russian Empire
Belarusian Jews
Canadian Ashkenazi Jews
Canadian people of Belarusian-Jewish descent
Polish emigrants to Canada
People from Svislach
Moishe
People of the Russian Civil War
19th-century Belarusian people
20th-century Belarusian Jews
Canadian people of the Russian Civil War